Gary Clark or Gary Clarke may refer to:

Sports
Gary Clarke (rugby league) (fl. 1968), New Zealand former professional rugby league footballer
Gary Clark (American football) (born 1962), American former football player
Gary Clark (footballer) (born 1964), Scottish former football midfielder
Gary Clark (golfer) (born 1971), English professional golfer
Gary Clark (basketball) (born 1994), American basketball player

Other people
Gary Clarke (born 1933), American actor
Gary Clark (cartoonist) (born 1954), Australian cartoonist, creator of Swamp
Gary Clark (musician) (born 1962), Scottish musician, lead singer of Danny Wilson
Gary Clarke (pastor), pastor of Hillsong London until early 2021
Gary Clark Jr. (born 1984), American guitarist

See also
Garry Clark, English rugby league footballer